A Copy of My Mind is a 2015 Indonesian drama film written and directed by Joko Anwar. A low-budget co-production between Indonesia and South Korea, the film stars Tara Basro and Chicco Jerikho. At the 35th Citra Awards, the film received seven nominations, winning three: Best Director for Anwar, Best Actress for Basro, and Best Sound.

Plot
A young woman who works at a cheap beauty salon in Jakarta meets a man who makes a living by doing subtitles for pirated DVDs. They quickly fall in love. But their romance is threatened to meet a tragic end as the political situation in the country is heating up during the presidential election. And the ones who suffer are usually common people.

Cast
 Tara Basro as Sari
 Chicco Jerikho as Alek
 Maera Panigoro as Mirna
 Paul Agusta as Bandi, a salon manager
 Ario Bayu as a hitman
 Ronny P. Tjandra as Ronny
 Tony Merle as DVD seller
 Suhaya as presidential candidate
 Windu Arifin as pirated DVD agents
 Ang Tjio Yang as Sari's landlady
 Sutirah as Alek's landlady

Production

Development 
Due to lack of funding, Anwar shopped the film's script to the Asian Project Market at the Busan International Film Festival in 2014, where it won the CJ Entertainment Award and a US$10,000 grant. The grant, coupled with a Rp 100 million loans from Anwar's friends, made up the film's Rp 250 million production budget.

Due to budget restrictions, the film's cast and crew did not get paid until the film started generating revenue once it was released. Tara Basro commented that she was willing to star in the film despite the uncertainty with salary because "Joko [Anwar] asked me to". Music composer Tony Merle, credited as Tony Setiaji, appeared in the film as a DVD seller.

Filming
To save money, the shooting only took 10 days to complete with 100 crew members. Anwar said in an interview with Coconuts Media that "The preparation took eight months. The shoot was brief, only eight days. But we deliberately made it brief because we didn’t want to film in sets. It [was filmed in] real locations, involving real people."

Release
The film had its world premiere at the Horizons section of the 72nd Venice International Film Festival, where it was the only Southeast Asian film to make the official selection. After further screenings at the Toronto International Film Festival, Busan International Film Festival, and International Film Festival Rotterdam, the film was released theatrically in Indonesia on 11 February 2016.

According to Anwar, a censored version of the film was used for theatrical release in Indonesia  due to the depiction of sex scenes and explicit language. The uncut version was shown at international film festivals.

Reception

Box office
As of 20 February 2016, the film had garnered 30 thousand admissions domestically.

Critical response
Reviewing the film following its screening in Venice, Craig Takeuchi of The Georgia Straight praised wrote "Like the meandering, observant nature of the film, the point of this story is more about exploring what happens when you lose your way, rather than simply getting to where you want to go."

Jason Bechervaise of Screen Daily praised Anwar's for "focus[ing] on characters and the strong chemistry between his two leads as he maintains a steady pace", further commenting that the film "is technically accomplished, paying careful if understated attention to the surroundings." Bechervaise also singled out Basro and Jerikho for "help[ing] carry the film with their carefully calculated performances" and their "genuine and natural abilities [to] help give the film more than a touch of authenticity and sincerity."

Upon its theatrical release, Adinda Zakiah of Cinema Poetica praised the film for being a "genuine and simple, but beautiful film" while noting Anwar's ability to write characters that "do not fall into the dichotomy of good and bad". Similarly, Endro Priherdityo of CNN Indonesia highlighted Anwar's ability to "depict the dark corners of Indonesia honestly and brilliantly" in reference to the film's political and class divide themes.

Awards and nominations

Sequels
Prior to the film's release, Anwar announced that he envisioned the film to be the first in a trilogy series. While no further confirmation has been made, Anwar hinted that the second and third films are called A Copy of My Soul and A Copy of My Heart and will tell different stories with different cast members.

References

External links
 

2015 films
2015 drama films
Indonesian drama films
2010s Indonesian-language films
CJ Entertainment films
Films directed by Joko Anwar